Kerthen Wood, or Kirthen Wood, is a hamlet near Townshend in Cornwall, England. It is in the civil parish of Crowan

References

Hamlets in Cornwall